The 2003 West Coast Conference Baseball Championship Series was held on May 23–25, 2003 at  home field, Eddy D. Field Stadium in Malibu, California, and pitted the winners of the conference's two four-team divisions.

Seeding

Results
Game One

Game Two

Game Three

References

West Coast Conference Baseball Championship
Tournament
Sports competitions in Los Angeles County, California
West Coast Conference Baseball Championship Series
West Coast Conference Baseball Championship Series